The Battle of Alnwick is one of two battles fought near the town of Alnwick in Northumberland, England. In the battle, which occurred on 13 November 1093, Malcolm III of Scotland, later known as Malcolm Canmore, was killed together with his son Edward by an army of knights led by Robert de Mowbray.

Background
At the time that William II of England, known as William Rufus, came to power, the control of northern Northumbria was still an open question. William set about rectifying this by appointing strong barons who would control the border and prevent Scottish incursions. It appears that Malcolm Canmore had ambitions regarding both Cumbria and Northumbria, and in May 1091 he invaded Northumbria and besieged Durham. William Rufus was forced to lead a large army north to meet this threat. He advanced into Scotland with Malcolm retreating in front of his army. Eventually a truce was negotiated and William withdrew.

The following year William strengthened his position in Cumbria to prevent the possibility of a Scottish invasion there.

The events leading up to the next invasion are unclear, but in November 1093, Malcolm led an army into Northumbria and began to besiege Alnwick.

Battle

At that time Robert de Mowbray was Earl of Northumbria, having been pardoned following his part in the Rebellion of 1088 against William II. He was also governor of Bamburgh Castle, a stronghold on the Northumbrian coast. Mowbray did not have a sufficient force at his command to oppose the Scottish army in open battle. However he set out to try to relieve Alnwick. He arrived there with his forces on 13 November (known as St Brice’s Day) and catching the Scottish army by surprise, the English knights attacked them before the ramparts of Alnwick.

Both Malcolm Canmore and his son Edward were killed in the fighting. The spring near which they died subsequently became known as “Malcolm’s Spring” or “Malcolm’s Well”. With Malcolm’s death the Scottish army found itself leaderless, and so headed back to Scotland. The body of Malcolm and his son were interred at Tynemouth Priory. There is uncertainty as to whether Malcolm’s body was re-interred in Dunfermline Abbey.

Aftermath
Malcolm’s death was soon followed by that of his queen, Margaret. The death of Malcolm and his heir meant that there was a dispute over the succession between Malcolm’s surviving sons and his younger brother Donald Bane. Donald became king but a civil war began with Malcolm’s sons trying to displace him. The lack of a strong, undisputed king in Scotland suited William Rufus well.

Robert de Mowbray, who defeated Malcolm, subsequently joined a baronial conspiracy against William Rufus in 1095, and, as a result, was dispossessed and imprisoned for life.

A rough stone memorial was placed to mark the place of the battle, north of Alnwick. This was replaced in 1774 by a more sophisticated one, Malcolm's Cross, erected by the Duchess of Northumberland.

References

John Sadler, Battle for Northumbria, 1988, Bridge Studios, 
Norman McCord and Richard Thompson, ''The Northern Counties from AD 1000', 1998, Addison Wesley Longman Limited, 

Alnwick
11th century in Scotland
1093 in England
Alnwick (1093)
History of the Scottish Borders
Alnwick (1093)
Alnwick
Alnwick 1093
1093 in Scotland